Vincent J. Speranza (born March 23, 1925) is an American private of Italian descent that served in the United States Army during World War II.

Early life
Speranza was born on March 23, 1925 in the Hell's Kitchen neighborhood of Manhattan, New York. He spent his childhood on Staten Island in a large and extended Italian family during the Great Depression. He had three brothers and four sisters. He graduated from high school in January 1943 and then enrolled at the City College of New York.

Military service
In 1943, after graduating from high school, Speranza enlisted in the United States Army. He tried to join at the age of 16, but had to wait until he was 18. Speranza was sent to Camp Upton in New York where he stayed until being sent to Fort Benning in Georgia where he trained for the infantry with the 87th Infantry Division, later volunteering for the Parachute Infantry, that he joined after completing a stint in Parachute School.

Speranza was sent overseas with Company H, 3rd Battalion, 501st Parachute Infantry Regiment, 101st Airborne Division from Camp Shanks on board the Queen Mary, landing in Scotland later moving to England, Belgium and finally France.  His unit arrived in France and would later fight in the Battle of the Bulge. Speranza's first engagement was during the Siege of Bastogne where he operated a machine gun from a foxhole in a forward position outside of the town. During the siege, he visited a wounded comrade at the field hospital set up in a local church, where his friend asked for a drink. Searching through the ruins of the town, he found a working beer tap and filled his helmet for lack of any other container. On delivering the beverage and returning for a second load, he was discovered by a medical officer and reprimanded.

Speranza spent a total of 144 days in combat and was discharged in January 1946. His highest rank was Private first class.

Life after the war

After the end of World War II, Speranza stayed in Allied-occupied France and Netherlands until December 1945, and then returned to New York, where he became a teacher at Curtis High School. For his service, he received a Purple Heart, Bronze Star, and a Presidential Unit Citation..

As part of the 75th anniversary commeration of Operation Market Garden in September 2019, Speranza was one of two veterans who participated in a parachute drop over North Brabant between Eerde and Schijndel.  

During the 2021 Christmas period, Speranza was featured in an hour long broadcast by the Overloon War Museum. This was one of a series of videos released by the museum while it was closed due to restrictions from the COVID-19 pandemic in the Netherlands.

In 2022, after participating in veteran events in Europe for 12 years, Speranza announced that he would no longer make the journey from the US to Europe, in order to preserve his health. The announcement came after he collapsed following a 28 hour journey home from Brussels to Springfield, Illinois.

Personal life
Speranza married Iva Leftwich in 1948 and they had a son and two daughters. He published a book named NUTS!: A 101st Airborne Division Machine Gunner at Bastogne in 2014. 

Speranza has a beer and a limited edition watch named after him.

Awards and decorations
American Campaign Medal
Army Good Conduct Medal
Bronze Star Medal (2x)
Combat Infantryman Badge
European-African-Middle Eastern Campaign Medal (with 2 campaign stars)
French Croix de Guerre
Fourragère
Honorary Medal in Bronze, municipality of Gerwen en Nederwetten
Honorary Medal in Bronze, municipality of Nuenen
Legion of Honour
Parachutist Badge
Presidential Unit Citation with Oak Leaf Cluster
Purple Heart (2x)
World War II Victory Medal

Filmography

References

External links
Vincent Speranza, Oral history from the Abraham Lincoln Presidential Library and Museum

1925 births
Living people